This was a new event in the ITF Women's Circuit.

Samantha Crawford won the inaugural edition, defeating Viktorija Golubic in the final, 6–3, 4–6, 6–2.

Seeds

Main draw

Finals

Top half

Bottom half

References 
 Main draw

CopperWynd Pro Women's Challenge - Singles